The Baldface Mountain volcanic field is a volcanic field in the Central Interior of British Columbia, Canada. The volcanic field contains at least eight volcanic cones and is one of two volcanic fields in the Anahim Volcanic Belt, the other being the Satah Mountain volcanic field which extends south from the Itcha Range.

Volcanic features
All features listed in this table were derived from Kuehn et al. (2015).

See also
List of volcanoes in Canada
Geology of British Columbia
Anahim hotspot

References

External links

Volcanic fields of Canada
Pleistocene volcanism
Anahim Volcanic Belt
Landforms of the Chilcotin
Volcanoes of British Columbia